Thomas Urquhart was a delegate to Florida's 1868 constitutional convention and a state legislator the same year representing Hamilton County, Florida and Suwannee County, Florida. He served in the Florida House of Representatives.

He was a signatory of Florida's 1868 constitution. He chaired the Committee of Enrolled Bills in the Florida House. He was white. He was recorded on the voter rolls for Wellborn, Florida.

See also
 African-American officeholders during and following the Reconstruction era

References

Members of the Florida House of Representatives
Year of birth missing
Year of death missing
People from Hamilton County, Florida
People from Suwannee County, Florida